Eikesdalen is a river valley and a small village in Molde Municipality in Møre og Romsdal county, Norway. The river Aura flows through the valley. The village is located at the south end of the lake Eikesdalsvatnet at the mouth of the river Aura. Most of the valley is filled by the lake and until 1991, taking a ferry across the lake was the only access between north and south of the valley. Most of the river Aura is diverted to the neighboring Sunndal Municipality and used in the power station there. Eikesdal Church is located in this village.

References

Molde
Villages in Møre og Romsdal